Valetta is a lightly populated locality in the mid-Canterbury region of New Zealand's South Island.  It is located in an agricultural area on the southern side of the Ashburton River / Hakatere.  Another river, the Hinds River, is to Valetta's southwest.  Nearby settlements include Mount Somers to the northwest, Anama to the west, Mayfield to the southwest, and Punawai to the southeast. Its name is a misspelling of Valletta, the capital of Malta.

Valetta was formerly served by the Mount Somers Branch, a branch line railway that diverged from the Main South Line at Tinwald, New Zealand, just south of Ashburton.  On 3 October 1882, the Westerfield to Anama section of the line opened with a station in Valetta.  Passengers ceased to be served by the railway on 9 January 1933 due to declining patronage as a result of increased private ownership of motor vehicles, but freight traffic stayed steady until after World War II.  It then declined to the point where the line was no longer profitable and it officially closed on 1 January 1968, though wheat was railed from Valetta until April 1968.  Some remnants of the railway still exist in and around Valetta: the station's goods shed, minor bridge abutments, and some of the line's formation.

Valetta has been identified as potentially at risk in the event of a major flood.  Construction of flood protection stopbanks along the southern branch of the Ashburton River is proposed but currently on hold.

References 

Ashburton District
Populated places in Canterbury, New Zealand